Maria Luís Albuquerque (born 16 September 1967 in Braga) is a Portuguese politician. She served as Minister of State and Finance between 2013 and 2015.

Early life and education
Albuquerque is married and has three children. She graduated in economics in 1991 from Universidade Lusíada, in Lisbon, and holds a Master's degree (1997) in Monetary and Financial Economics from ISEG, Technical University of Lisbon.

Career
Albuquerque worked at the Directorate General of Treasury from 1996 to 1999; at the office of Higher Technical Studies and Economic Forecasts of the Ministry of Economy from 1999 to 2001 and as an advisor to the Secretary of State for Treasury and Finance in 2001. Between 2001 and 2007 she was director of the Department of Financial Management of REFER, the railway infrastructure public company. From 2007 to 2011 she was head of Issuing and Markets Department at the Portuguese Debt Management Agency. She was a lecturer at Universidade Lusíada between 1991 and 2006.

At the XIX Constitutional Government, Maria Luís Albuquerque became Secretary of State for Treasury and Finance between June 2011 and October 2012 and Secretary of State for Treasury between October 2012 and June 2013. In such capacity, she followed Eurogroup and Ecofin matters as alternate to the then Minister of State and Finance.

Minister of State and Finance, 2013-2015
Albuquerque's appointment was followed by the resignation of the former Minister of Foreign Affairs, Paulo Portas, who had openly criticized her nomination. Questions were raised after she denied that the Government had been informed about "swap" operations performed under the Government of Prime Minister José Sócrates, while the former minister of finance, Vitor Gaspar, admitted that he had been informed. She is only the second woman to hold the office of finance minister in Portugal, after Manuela Ferreira Leite.

As finance minister, Albuquerque has been supporting the reform program advocated by Portugal's creditors and put in place by Gaspar. In January 2015, she announced that Portugal would follow Ireland with an early repayment of bailout loans from the International Monetary Fund after borrowing costs fell and the country was able to sell 30-year bonds. At the time, Portugal's economy was growing again after a three-year recession caused by a debt crisis and austerity.

Also, Albuquerque bolstered Portugal's bank resolution fund (Fundo de Resolução) in 2014 by earmarking 5.4 billion euros in Treasury loans. In early August 2014, she spent 4.9 billion euros to rescue Banco Espírito Santo, the country's second-largest lender, mostly from public funds. The bank was split into a regular bank called Novo Banco and a "bad bank" that inherited unserviced debt.

In her position as finance minister, Albuquerque also served as a member of the board of governors at the African Development Bank, the European Stability Mechanism and the European Investment Bank.

Following the 2014 European elections, it was believed that Passos Coelho was going to nominate Luís Albuquerque as Portugal's member of the European Commission, a job that eventually went to Carlos Moedas. At the time, there was speculation in the Portuguese press that Luís Albuquerque was not nominated because Jean-Claude Juncker would not guarantee her a weighty portfolio in the commission.

Life after politics
Following her party's defeat after the 2015 national elections where it won the single largest vote with 38.6% securing almost 47% of the seats in the Assembly before a left-wing coalition has risen to power, Luís Albuquerque left her office as finance minister and became a non-executive director at Arrow Global, a UK-based provider of debt purchase and receivables management solutions. She joined the company's Audit & Risk Committee.

In June 2016, Luís Albuquerque made headlines when she wrote in an article published in business daily Jornal de Negócios that "it is public knowledge that Caixa Geral de Depósitos (CGD) granted large loans in the past, without sufficient guarantees and using practices that are difficult to justify to the public interest." Shortly after, Portugal's government ordered an independent audit of the country's largest bank, state-owned CGD.

References

1967 births
Women government ministers of Portugal
Living people
20th-century Portuguese economists
Portuguese women economists
Technical University of Lisbon alumni
Finance ministers of Portugal
Female finance ministers
21st-century Portuguese women politicians
21st-century Portuguese politicians
21st-century Portuguese economists